Regional League Central Division is the 3rd Level League in Thailand. It was formed in 2016 along with another region, making it 8 regions/leagues at the same level. The winner and runner-up of each regional league enter the Regional League Championships to determine the three teams that will receive promotion to the Thai Division 1 League.

League history

Formed in 2016, with 11 clubs.

Timeline

Championship history

Member clubs

 
Nor
Sports leagues established in 2016
2016 establishments in Thailand